Jeff Rowland (born June 18, 1984 in Albuquerque, New Mexico) is an America former soccer forward and soccer coach who serves as an assistant coach for the University of Notre Dame.

Youth
Rowland attended La Cueva High School where he played on the boys soccer team.  He missed his senior season with a knee injury and was not recruited by any major colleges.  In 2002, he entered the University of New Mexico, making the Lobos soccer team as a walk on.  He finished the season with three goals in ten games, earning a roster spot for the next season.  Rowland led the Lobos in scoring the next three seasons, being selected as a 2004 and 2005 first team All American.  He left the University of New Mexico as the most decorated soccer player in school history; as a Hermann Trophy finalist, the only two-time All-American in school history, a two-time Academic All-American, ranking 3rd in points, 2nd in goals, 9th in assists with 5 goals and 3 assists in NCAA Tournament play.

Professional
During the 2003, 2004 and 2005 collegiate off seasons, Rowland played in the fourth division Premier Development League.  In 2003 and 2004, he was with the Indiana Invaders and in 2005 with the Chicago Fire Premier.  In 2004, he scored 18 goals in 15 games with the Invaders. On January 26, 2006, the Real Salt Lake picked Rowland second overall in the 2006 MLS Supplemental Draft.  Rowland tore the anterior cruciate ligament in his right knee during the preseason.  He had surgery, but Salt Lake waived him on March 31, 2006.  Rowland lost the 2006 season, then rejoined Real Salt Lake in 2007 only to tear his right ACL before he played a game.

Salt Lake waived him again on May 10, 2007 when it became clear that he would lose the 2007 season.  In 2008, Rowland rejoined Real Salt Lake, but was released in February.  He then signed with the Wilmington Hammerheads of the USL Second Division.

Rowland signed a senior developmental contract with FC Dallas in September, 2008. However, he was waived a few months later after the 2008 season ended.

Coaching 
Ahead of the 2011 NCAA Division I men's soccer season, Rowland was named an associate head coach for the Washington Huskies men's soccer program. Prior to 2021, he moved to Notre Dame.

References

External links
 University of Washington profile
 University of New Mexico profile
 Wilmington Hammerhead profile

Living people
1984 births
American soccer players
New Mexico Lobos men's soccer players
Real Salt Lake players
FC Dallas players
Wilmington Hammerheads FC players
USL Second Division players
Indiana Invaders players
Chicago Fire U-23 players
USL League Two players
Real Salt Lake draft picks
Soccer players from New Mexico
All-American men's college soccer players
Association football forwards
Washington Huskies men's soccer coaches
American soccer coaches